¡Damas y Caballeros! (Ladies and Gentlemen) is the first live album by American instrumental rock band Los Straitjackets, released on February 27, 2001, by Yep Roc Records. It was recorded in September 2000 at a performance in Long Beach, California and produced by Mark Linett and the band.

Track listing

Personnel
Los Straitjackets
Danny Amis – guitar, production, mixing, mastering
Eddie Angel – guitar, production
Pete Curry – bass, production
Jimmy Lester – drums, production
Additional personnel
Mark Linett – production, engineering, mixing, mastering
Margaret Gwynne – engineering
Kaiser George and the Hi-Risers – choreography

References

Los Straitjackets albums
2001 live albums